Nicholas Simons is a Canadian politician. He is a Member of the Legislative Assembly (MLA) of British Columbia, representing the riding of Powell River-Sunshine Coast since 2005, and member of the New Democratic Party.

Early life and career
Simons grew up in Montreal, with his musician father Jan Simons teaching at McGill University. He studied criminology at university, graduating with a bachelor's degree from University of Ottawa and master's degree from Simon Fraser University.

Before entering politics, Simons worked as a child-protection social worker for the Ministry for Children and Family Development, as a financial assistance worker, and as the crime prevention coordinator for the Northwest Territories.  He has been a consultant for the federal, Northwest Territories and First Nations governments in areas of law reform and child welfare.

He served as the executive director of health and social development for the Sechelt Nation from 1997 until 2005. In this role he oversaw health, child welfare, alcohol and drugs, financial assistance and justice programs.  He also negotiated funding for innovative preventative health and social services.

Politics
Simons was a candidate for the New Democratic Party in the 2004 federal election, running in the riding of West Vancouver–Sunshine Coast. While he finished third, the experience convinced him to run as a candidate for the British Columbia New Democratic Party (BC NDP) in the provincial election the following year, in which he was elected MLA for Powell River-Sunshine Coast. He was re-elected in 2009, 2013, 2017 and 2020. He is one of four openly gay members of the provincial legislature.

In the legislature, Simons has served as chair of the Caucus Social Policy Committee, critic for Tourism, Sport and the Arts, and as critic for the Ministry for Children and Family Development.

He is rumoured to be one of thirteen provincial caucus members who forced the resignation of Carole James from her position as leader of the BC NDP.  James announced her resignation on December 6, 2010, after consulting with a group of caucus members opposed to her continued leadership. Simons declared his candidacy in the subsequent leadership race on January 5, 2011, but withdrew on April 7 and threw his support behind John Horgan.

On November 26, 2020 he was appointed Minister of Social Development and Poverty Reduction. With the announcement of Premier David Eby's new cabinet on December 7, 2022, Simons was replaced in that role by Sheila Malcolmson, and was instead named NDP caucus chair.

Electoral record

Personal life
Simons is a cellist, whose musical credits include several tracks on Rise Against's 2004 album Siren Song of the Counter Culture. Simons and Vancouver mayor Gregor Robertson both perform on country-punk musician Slim Milkie's 2010 album Silverado; Milkie, whose real name is Scott Scobbie, is Simons' partner.

References

External links
Profile on the website of the Legislative Assembly of British Columbia
Profile on the website of the British Columbia NDP Caucus

British Columbia New Democratic Party MLAs
Canadian people of German descent
Gay politicians
Canadian LGBT people in provincial and territorial legislatures
Year of birth missing (living people)
Living people
Canadian cellists
21st-century Canadian politicians
New Democratic Party candidates for the Canadian House of Commons
University of Ottawa alumni
Simon Fraser University alumni
21st-century Canadian LGBT people
Canadian gay men